The Townsville and District Rugby Union (TDRU) is a regional rugby union based in the city of Townsville, Queensland, Australia. It was founded in 1967 and is the governing body for rugby union in and around the city of Townsville.

Clubs
 Brothers Rugby Union (Townsville)
 Burdekin Rugby Union
 Charters Towers Rugby Union
 Grammar Rugby Union
 Ingham Rugby Union
 James Cook University of North Queensland Rugby Union
 North Ward Junior Rugby
 North Ward Old Boys Rugby
 Ross River Redskins/Lavarack Army Rugby Club (LARC)
 Teachers West Rugby Union
 Western Suburbs Rugby Union

See also

 Rugby union in Queensland

References

External links
 

1967 establishments in Australia
Sports organizations established in 1967
Rugby union governing bodies in Queensland
Sport in Townsville